Ara Ake (previously the National New Energy Development Centre) is a government funded entity set up to develop clean energy technologies for New Zealand.

The centre was announced in 2019, as the National New Energy Development Centre, with $27m funding. In July 2020, Prime Minister Jacinda Ardern announced the name change to Ara Ake and Dr Cristiano Marantos as CEO.

Ara Ake has established relationships with the MacDiarmid Institute, Independent Electricity Generators Association, Taranaki Chamber of Commerce, Carbon and Energy Professionals New Zealand, National Energy Research Institute and Elemental Excelerator.

See also
 Climate change in New Zealand

References

Climate change in New Zealand